Recanati Winery is a winery situated in the Hefer Valley in Israel. Production is 900,000–1 million bottles annually.

History
The winery was founded in 2000 by Lenny Recanati (b. 1953). The winery produces young red and white blends under its Yasmin label, varietals under its Recanati and Reserve labels, and a Special Reserve. All grapes are hand-harvested, two-thirds originating in Recanati’s high-altitude Manara vineyards in the Upper Galilee with which it has contracts, and the remainder from vineyards planted in the clay-rich soil of the Jezreel Valley.

Chief winemaker Gil Shatsberg, a graduate of the U.C. Davis wine program, worked for Amphorae and Carmel wineries before joining Recanati. Shatsberg replaced Lewis Pasco, previously winemaker for Chimney Rock and Marimar Torres in California.

See also
Israeli wine
Israeli cuisine

References

Wineries of Israel
Recanati family